Hewa Bora Airways Sarl (operating as Hewa Bora Airways) was the national airline of the Democratic Republic of the Congo based in Barumbu, Kinshasa, Democratic Republic of the Congo. It was one of Congo's largest airlines and operated regional and domestic services. Its main base was N'djili Airport. "Hewa bora" is Swahili for "fresh air".  The company slogan was N°1 in Democratic Republic of the Congo.

Hewa Bora Airways had 1,100 employees in March 2007.

Operations were suspended after the 2011 crash of Hewa Bora Airways Flight 952, and the airline is now defunct. The remains of the business were taken over by a new airline, FlyCongo, which in turn merged with the Compagnie Africaine d'Aviation only six months after it was started up

History 
The airline was established and started operations in 1998 with the joining together of Zaire Airlines, Zaire Express, and Congo Airlines.

On 1 November 2007, HBA (51%) and Brussels Airlines subsidiary Pan African Airlines (49%) announced a new domestic partnership to be called AirDC, to operate BAe 146-200 and Boeing 737 aircraft, principally to Lubumbashi, Mbuji-Mayi, Brazzaville, and Douala.
This project was cancelled because of disagreements between Brussels Airlines and Hewa Bora. On 15 December 2009, Brussels Airlines announced they are working on a new airline in the Congo. The airline's name was Korongo; it was launched without Hewa Bora and started operations during 2012, suspending all operations during 2015.

On the 24 June 2009, the new website of Hewa Bora Airways went online, after not having been updated since 2005.

On 16 July 2011, the airline's Air Operator's Certificate was suspended, following the accident that befell Flight 952 on 8 July 2011.

Blacklist
The entire Hewa Bora Airways fleet was blacklisted in European airspace. The Lockheed L-1011-500 and the Boeing 767-200ER were the last planes accepted in Europe before new noise regulations and storage of the 767 definitively banned the airline. Hewa Bora Airways was the last airline allowed to operate from the Democratic Republic of the Congo into Europe.

FlyCongo
In March 2012, FlyCongo launched operations with the remains of Hewa Bora. It uses the airline's previous Boeing 767 and McDonnell Douglas MD-82 aircraft. It also announced it would be destroying six aircraft left behind by Hewa Bora to reduce safety concerns.

Destinations

Codeshare agreements 

After a dispute with Brussels Airlines, Hewa Bora Airways decided to rescind the codeshare agreement between the two airlines and start their own flights to Brussels. However, as Hewa Bora was banned from the European Union, they had to wet-lease a RAK Airways Boeing 757-200 to operate the flights. For a short time, the airline flew twice weekly Kinshasa-Brussels-Paris-Brussels-Kinshasa. Such flights were discontinued due to the EU's total ban of Hewa Bora operations. It then became impossible for Hewa Bora to fly to the EU.

Fleet 

The Hewa Bora Airways fleet included the following aircraft when it suspended operations:

Retired fleet 

Hewa Bora Airways also operated these aircraft prior to ceasing operations:

Incidents and accidents 
On 15 April 2008, Hewa Bora Airways Flight 122 crashed into a residential and market area of Goma of the Democratic Republic of the Congo.  Forty people were killed, among them three passengers; 111 people were injured, including 40 passengers.
On 21 June 2010, Hewa Bora Airways Flight 601, operating a McDonnell Douglas MD-82 9Q-COQ,  burst a tyre on take-off from N'djili Airport. Hydraulic systems and the port engine were damaged and the nose gear failed to lower when the aircraft returned to N'djili. All 110 people on board escaped uninjured. The airline blamed the state of the runway for the accident, but investigators found no fault with the runway.
On 8 July 2011, Hewa Bora Airways Flight 952, a Boeing 727-100, crashed on landing at Kisangani Airport; 74 people were killed, whilst others survived the accident with severe burns.

See also		
 Transport in the Democratic Republic of the Congo

References

External links 

 Hewa Bora Airways
 Hewa Bora Airways 
 Hewa Bora Airways Fleet
 Hewa Bora Airways at the Aviation Safety Network Database

Defunct airlines of the Democratic Republic of the Congo
Airlines established in 1994
Airlines disestablished in 2011
1994 establishments in Zaire